"Eyes on Me" is a song recorded by Canadian singer Celine Dion, taken from her tenth English-language studio album, Taking Chances (2007). It was released as the second single in the United Kingdom on 7 January 2008, while "Alone" was released as the second single in the rest of Europe and North America instead.

The Middle Eastern-flavored song was written by Kristian Lundin, Savan Kotecha and Australian singer Delta Goodrem. Goodrem also provides backing vocals on the track, while production was handled by Lundin. The latter worked with Dion in the past on "That's the Way It Is" and "I'm Alive" among others. The critics heavily compared the track to Shakira songs.

Dion performed the song during An Audience with Celine Dion, which aired in the UK on ITV on 22 December 2007. She also performed a remix version featuring will.i.am from The Black Eyed Peas during her CBS special, That's Just the Woman in Me, which aired in the US on 15 February 2008.

"Eyes on Me" was released in the UK with virtually no promotion surrounding it in the media, leading to its peak position at number 113 on the UK Singles Chart. The music video for "Eyes on Me" was released on 5 May 2008, containing footage from the Taking Chances World Tour in Africa and Asia.

Background and release
"Eyes on Me" was released as the second single taken from Taking Chances in the United Kingdom on 4 January 2008, while the CD-single was released on 11 January 2008, through music retailers across the United Kingdom. "Alone" was released as the second single in the rest of Europe and North America instead. The single included a remix  by Ashanti Boyz, whose latest work includes remixes for Jennifer Lopez tracks: "Do It Well" and "Hold It Don't Drop It." In October 2008, "Eyes on Me" was included on the European version of My Love: Ultimate Essential Collection. A live version was included in the Taking Chances World Tour: The Concert CD/DVD.

Composition
"Eyes on Me" was written by Kristian Lundin, Savan Kotecha and Australian recording artist Delta Goodrem, while production was handled by Lundin, who worked with Dion in the past on "That's the Way It Is" and "I'm Alive". Goodrem also provides backing vocals on the track. "Eyes on Me" is a Middle-Eastern-flavored song and
lyrically, it is a tale of a teasing minx goading her boyfriend, featuring the lines: "Temptation is all around... you better keep your eyes on me."

Critical reception
Reception towards the song was favorable, with many critics highlighting that the song sounds a lot like Shakira songs. Stephen Thomas Erlewine from AllMusic wrote that "Celine tries to shimmy like Shakira on 'Eyes on Me,'"  while Sarah Rodman from The Boston Globe opined that "Eyes On Me colors a bit outside the lines with an irresistibly wiggly, Eastern-flavored groove. (Shakira will kick herself for not getting it first.") Ashante Infantry from Toronto Star called it an "urban pop bounce, where Celine is channelling her inner Shakira". Nick Levine from Digital Spy expressed that the song "finds Dion taking an ill-advised swerve towards Shakira territory in pursuit of that all-important comeback smash. As ever, the Canadian belter is on ripe old form, tearing into the hackneyed lyrics with real spirit."

Promotion and live performances

Dion performed the song during An Audience with Celine Dion, which aired in the UK on ITV on 22 December 2007. She also performed a remix version featuring will.i.am from The Black Eyed Peas during her CBS special, That's Just the Woman in Me, which aired in the US on 15 February 2008. The song was used in a TV commercial for Dion's fragrance Sensational.  The music video for "Eyes on Me" was released on 5 May 2008, containing footages from the Taking Chances World Tour in Africa and Asia.

The song only peaked at number 113 on the UK Singles Chart, due to little promotion, when the single was released.

Track listing and formats
UK CD and digital single
"Eyes on Me" (Album Version) – 3:53
"Eyes on Me" (Ashanti Boyz Club Remix) – 6:38
"Eyes on Me" (In Studio Video) – 6:22

UK promotional CD single
"Eyes on Me" (Radio Edit) – 3:40

Charts

Credits and personnel
Recording locations
Recording - CMK Studios (Los Angeles, California)
 Studio at the Palms (Paradise, Nevada)

Personnel
Songwriting –  Kristian Lundin, Savan Kotecha, Delta Goodrem
Production –  Kristian Lundin
Mixing  - Kristian Lundin
Guitars & Bass  - Kristian Lundin
Keyboards & Programming  - Ned Douglas
Guitars   - Karl Engström, Sebastian Thott
Backing Vocals  - Kristian Lundin, Delta Goodrem

Credits adapted from the liner notes of Taking Chances, Epic Records.

Release history

References

Celine Dion songs
2008 singles
Songs written by Savan Kotecha
Songs written by Kristian Lundin
Songs written by Delta Goodrem
2007 songs
Columbia Records singles